The 2019 Boston College Eagles men's soccer team represented Boston College during the 2019 NCAA Division I men's soccer season.  The Eagles were led by head coach Ed Kelly, in his fourteenth season.  They played home games at Newton Soccer Complex.  This was the team's 53rd season playing organized men's college soccer and their 15th playing in the Atlantic Coast Conference.

Background

The 2018 Boston College men's soccer team finished the season with a 4–8–4 overall record and a 2–5–1 ACC record.  The Eagles were seeded ninth–overall in the 2018 ACC Men's Soccer Tournament, where they lost in the first round to NC State.

The Eagles were not invited to the 2018 NCAA Division I Men's Soccer Tournament, and did not have any players selected in the 2019 MLS SuperDraft.

Player movement

Players leaving

Players arriving

Squad

Roster
Updated August 19, 2019

Team management

Source:

Schedule 
Source:

|-
!colspan=7 style=""| Exhibition
|-

|-
!colspan=7 style=""| Regular season

|-
!colspan=7 style=""| ACC Tournament

|-
!colspan=7 style=""| NCAA Tournament

Awards and honors

Rankings

References

2019
Boston College Eagles
Boston College Eagles
Boston College Eagles men's soccer
Boston College Eagles